Claire Feuerstein was the defending champion but lost in the quarterfinals to Anna-Lena Friedsam.

Kristýna Plíšková won the tournament, defeating Tamira Paszek in the final, 3–6, 6–3, 6–2.

Seeds

Main draw

Finals

Top half

Bottom half

External Links
 Main draw

Open Gdf Suez Region Limousin - Singles
Open de Limoges